William A. Trimble (1786–1821), U.S. Senator from Ohio from 1819 to 1821. Senator Trimble may also refer to:

Allen Trimble (1783–1870), Ohio State Senate
Gordon Trimble (born 1944), Hawaii State Senate
John Trimble (politician) (1812–1884), Tennessee State Senate